Government Senior Secondary School 31 P.S., also known as GSSS31PS, is a day boarding school situated in 31 P.S. Tehsil Raisinghnagar (Sri Ganganagar district), Rajasthan, India. Earlier it was known as Government Secondary School 31 P.S.. It is one of the oldest schools in Sri Ganganagar district.

History

GSSS 31 P.S., the oldest government primary school, was started as a Pathshala in 1954 by the Government of Rajasthan for the education of the village's poor pupils. Raised to a secondary school in 1984, it developed into a senior secondary school in 2007 and was named a government senior secondary school. The school is managed and run by the Secondary Education Department of Rajasthan.

Affiliation

The school was affiliated to the RBSE. The institute is monitored by District Education Officer for secondary education Nagar under Education Department of Rajasthan state government. The school has permanent recognition for a 10+2 level from the Government of Rajasthan and the Board of Secondary Education, Rajasthan.

Academics
The school offers secondary classes from year 9 to year 12 in Arts, including History, Political Science, Hindi literature, and Geography.

Sports and other activities
The school has separate grounds for hockey, football, volleyball, cricket, and athletics. Other activities offered includepottery, photography and science clubs, Scouts, Guides, Cubs and Bulbuls, cultural groups, SUPW (social productive works) and social services, NSS and career guidance. The school has a well-managed and fulfilled library where thousands of books of all subjects are available.

References

External links
 http://www.rajshiksha.gov.in 

High schools and secondary schools in Rajasthan
Education in Sri Ganganagar district
Educational institutions established in 1954
1954 establishments in Rajasthan